Krushynka is a small village in Fastiv Raion in the Kyiv Oblast (province) of northern Ukraine. It belongs to Hlevakha settlement hromada, one of the hromadas of Ukraine. Krushynka has 347 inhabitants.

History
It is known at least from the 16th century.

Until 18 July 2020, Krushynka belonged to Vasylkiv Raion. The raion was abolished that day as part of the administrative reform of Ukraine, which reduced the number of raions of Kyiv Oblast to seven. The area of Vasylkiv Raion was split between Bila Tserkva, Fastiv, and Obukhiv Raions, with Krushynka being transferred to Fastiv Raion.

Nature

Apple gardens

Transport 
There is a bus from Kyiv to Vasylkiv. Then there is a local bus from the bus stop "Krushynka" to the center of village.

Architecture

Church

Shops 

In the time of the Soviet Union, there was a Prodmag (food market, Prod(ovolstvennyi) Mag(azin) on Russian). That shop is still there, but it has modern goods. It is at center of village on Kyivska Street.

Another store among the people just hendelyk, near the so-called rivchak (little brook).
A third store opened in 2008, and is located outside the village.

School

Culture

Village club 
In the time of the Soviet Union, there was a village club. But with the ending of the Soviet Union, the club died.

Gallery

References

External links 

 село Крушинка (сайт Української конфедерації журналістів). 

Villages in Fastiv Raion